Mechukha or Menchukha (In Memba dialect, 'Men' means Medicine, 'Chu' means Water -streams, rivers, etc. & 'Kha' means Snow; Meaning "the land blessed with medicinal snow-fed water- river & streams") is a town, assembly constituency and subdivision, situated  above sea level  in the Mechukha Valley of Yargep Chu/ Siyom River in Shi Yomi district of Arunachal Pradesh state of India. Before the 1950s, Mechuka valley was known as Pachakshiri. 

Line of Actual Control (McMahon Line) India-Tibet border 29 km north of Menchuka separates Indian territory and Chinese territory. Mechukha has a AGL airstrip. Reachable by one of the strategic India-China Border Roads, it is located 47 km northwest of district head office Tato and 187 km north of Aalo.

Background

Etymology

The name Men-chu-kha means medicinal water of snow where men is medicine, while me refers to fire, chu is water and kha means ice in the local language, thus the difference in meaning of the two different names as per local belief.".

History 

Mechuka is part of Arunachal Pradesh state of India. Prior to the construction of the modern road, the only access to the village was via an airstrip, used by the Indian Air Force to supply goods to local people. During those times (adi)ramo people use to trade with tibet like mithun for a salt and medicines. 
Horses were their main means of travelling. People often sell horses for money, those time who used to have lots of cattle were regarded as rich.

Politics 
Mechuka is an election constituency of Arunachal Pradesh Legislative Assembly. As of June 2019, the MLA elected from Mechuka constituency is Pasang Dorjee Sona.

Demographics

Menchukha/Mechukha Valley is home to the people of the Memba and Adi people.  Other local people include Tagin tribes.  The current MLA (August-2016) of Mechuka constituency is Pasang Dorjee Sona.

Religions practiced in the valley include Mahayana Buddhism, Donyi-Poloism, and Christianity.  Mechukha is known for both its religious and historical significance. The 400-year-old Samten Yongcha monastery of Mahayana Buddhist sect is a contemporary of the much-revered Tawang Monastery.A research report claimed that foundation of the Samten Yongcha monastery is older than that of Tawang Monastery.

The languages spoken in Mechuka are Tshangla, Adi, Tagin, Hindi, and English. There is no evidence of Tshangla still being spoken in Menchukha valley. Instead, the people speak Memba, which is a Bodish language made up of a mixture of various Bodic varieties (dwags-po, kong-po, brag-gsum mtsho-'khor), East Bodish Tawang Monpa, Tshangla and some Tani loans. Some Memba people still speak Tawang Monpa.In and around the periphery of Mechukha town and especially Mechukha Circle, population is dominated by Memba tribe.
The largest tribe's of Shi Yomi district is (Adi) bokar mainly residing in the Monigong circle, Memba inhabating the valleys of Mechukha ,libo and  ramo inhabating the Tato circle, most of the people speak adi in Shi yomi district after that memba and then tagin.

Transport

Mechuka Airport

The Indian Air Force maintains an airstrip, known as the Advanced Landing Ground (ALG) in Mechukha.  The airstrip is used frequently to bring in vital supplies from cities in Assam via Antonov-32 aircraft and helicopters. The runway was renovated, strengthened, upgraded to a concrete runway and extended to 4,700 feet in 2017 by the government. The area has a significant military presence, which also creates some employment opportunities for civilians. There is a twice a week helicopter service under the UDAN scheme on Monday and Saturday. Government of Arunachal Pradesh has invited bids from the private airlines to operate a 9-seater fixed-wing air service which will not be under the UDAN scheme (c. May 2018). On 3 Jun 2019, An Indian Air Force Plane Carrying 13 went missing after taking off From Assam toward this airport.
The wreckage of this aircraft was found in Siang circle sometime on 11 June 2019 and has been confirmed to District officials by IAF. The wreckage was spotted by an MI17 helicopter that was on search & rescue mission since last 8 days.

Highways

Mechukha has recently been connected by a strategic road to Tato and Aalo (formerly called Along), leading to increased development in the area.  Mechukha has since become a subdivisional headquarters.

The  proposed Mago-Thingbu to Vijaynagar Arunachal Pradesh Frontier Highway along the McMahon Line, (will intersect with the proposed East-West Industrial Corridor Highway) and will pass through Mechuka, alignment map of which can be seen here and here.

Tourism

Mechukha is gradually becoming a popular tourist destination in Arunachal Pradesh due to its scenic beauty, exotic tribes, gentle hills and snow-capped mountains and Siyom River (locally known as Yargyap Chu). The Siyom River, which flows through Mechukha also provides a scenic view in the valley.

The major tourist attraction here is a 400-year-old Buddhist Monastery, which is located at a hilltop in the westernmost part of Mechukha. Numerous ancient statues can also be found here. Accommodations are available at Tourist lodges and Inspection Bungalow and a few hotels are also coming up to meet the increasing influx of tourists from the country and abroad. The people of Adi tribe have resided in the Menchukha valley since time immemorial in the periphery of Mechukha valley in the villages of Gapo, Pauk, Padusa, Lipusi, Hiri, Purying, Rapum, Charung, Rego and Kart gumjipang, barang gang, shorang dhem, etc.

A new giant flying squirrel was discovered and described from the area by noted naturalist of North East India Dr. Anwaruddin Choudhury, who named Mechuka's giant flying squirrel Petaurista mechukaensis. The IUCN RedList has classified it as a Data Deficient species.

See also

 North-East Frontier Agency
 List of people from Arunachal Pradesh
 Religion in Arunachal Pradesh
 Cuisine of Arunachal Pradesh
 List of institutions of higher education in Arunachal Pradesh

References

External links

Cities and towns in Shi Yomi district